Charles Ramsdell may refer to:

 Charles Ramsdell (basketball) (born 1985), Malagasy basketball player
 Charles W. Ramsdell (1877–1942), American historian